William Larrabee may refer to:

William Larrabee (Iowa politician) (1832–1912), Governor of Iowa
William Larrabee (Indiana politician) (1870–1960), Congressman from Indiana
William C. Larrabee (1802–1859), president of Depauw University